Acraea zoumi is a butterfly in the family Nymphalidae. It is found in Ethiopia. For taxonomy see Pierre & Bernaud, 2014

References

Butterflies described in 1995
zoumi
Endemic fauna of Ethiopia
Butterflies of Africa